Albion Qaush Avdijaj (born 12 January 1994) is a professional footballer who plays as a forward. Born in Switzerland, he represented that nation at youth international levels, appeared in two friendly matches for the Kosovo senior team, and played twice for Albania at under-21 level.

Club career

VfL Wolfsburg II
After failing to break to Grasshopper's first team, Avdijaj joined the reserve team of VfL Wolfsburg for the 2015–16 season. He made his debut in the Regionalliga on 17 August, playing full-90 minutes in a 1–0 away win to Neumünster. Then Avdijaj scored his first goals with Wolves on 6 September in a 4–0 home hammering of Havelse. Avdijaj continued with his strong form, scoring against Eintracht Norderstedt, the winner against VfB Oldenburg, before scoring another brace in the 4–2 home win over Braunschweig, taking his tally up to 6 goals.

Vaduz
On 30 August 2015, on the deadline day, Avdijaj completed a transfer to Vaduz for an undisclosed fee, signing until June 2017. Upon signing, Avdijaj stated: "The transfer is successfully completed, I'm ready for the new challenge. He was allocated squad number 7, and made his competitive debut on 12 September in the opening Swiss Super League week against Young Boys, entering as a second-half substitute in an eventual 4–0 away crash. He opened his scoring account later on 31 October where he scored the opener against Basel, which turned out to be nothing as visitors bounced back to win 2–1. One week later, Avdijaj was again on the scoresheet, netting in the 72nd minute against FC Zürich but was sent-off two minutes later following a second yellow card; the match finished in a 1–1 draw.

Viborg FF
On 3 September 2019, Avdijaj joined Viborg FF in Denmark on a three-year deal. On 19 May 2020 the club confirmed, that Avdijaj's contract had been terminated, because he wanted to be closer to his family in Switzerland.

Kriens
On 1 July 2021, he signed with Kriens.

International career

Kosovo
In May 2014, Avdijaj accepted an invitation from Albert Bunjaku to play for Kosovo in the friendlies against Turkey and Senegal. He made his first appearance for Kosovo against Turkey on 21 May, appearing as a substitute in the 60th minute in an eventual 1–6 home defeat. Four days later he made his second appearance, his first as a starter, in another defeat, this time to Senegal at Stade de Genève. Those were his only appearances for Kosovo, as he switched to play for Albania.

Career statistics

Club

International

Honours
Grasshoppers
Swiss Cup: 2012–13

FC Vaduz
Liechtenstein Football Cup: 2015-16, 2016-17

References

External links
 
 Albion Avdijaj profile at FSHF.org

1994 births
Living people
Footballers from Zürich
Swiss people of Albanian descent
Swiss people of Kosovan descent
Kosovo Albanians
Association football forwards
Swiss men's footballers
Kosovan footballers
Albanian footballers
Albanian expatriate footballers
Albania under-21 international footballers
Kosovo international footballers
Swiss Promotion League players
Swiss Challenge League players
Regionalliga players
Swiss Super League players
Nemzeti Bajnokság I players
Danish 1st Division players
VfL Wolfsburg II players
FC Vaduz players
Grasshopper Club Zürich players
Debreceni VSC players
Viborg FF players
KF Tirana players
KF Vllaznia Shkodër players
SC Kriens players
Albanian expatriate sportspeople in Germany
Albanian expatriate sportspeople in Liechtenstein
Albanian expatriate sportspeople in Hungary
Albanian expatriate sportspeople in Denmark
Expatriate footballers in Germany
Expatriate footballers in Liechtenstein
Expatriate footballers in Hungary
Expatriate men's footballers in Denmark
Swiss expatriate footballers
Swiss expatriate sportspeople in Germany
Swiss expatriate sportspeople in Liechtenstein
Swiss expatriate sportspeople in Hungary
Swiss expatriate sportspeople in Denmark
Kosovan expatriate footballers
Kosovan expatriate sportspeople in Germany
Kosovan expatriate sportspeople in Liechtenstein
Kosovan expatriate sportspeople in Hungary
Kosovan expatriate sportspeople in Denmark